MNK Olmissum is a professional futsal club based in Omiš, Croatia. Most famous player Josip Kolobarić

History
The club is founded on 1 July 2015 by Mijo Milavić and Josip Škorić. Milavić came up with the idea of founding the club after watching the matches of the UEFA Futsal EURO 2012 in the Spaladium Arena in Split with his company with which he plays recreational futsal. The club started with official competitions played in Futsal County league of Split-Dalmatia County and won it after two season, of which he won the second without losing a point.

Olmissum ends the first season in the Croatian second futsal league-group South second, in win the league next season and in the playoffs against other winners of the second league groups to achieve placement in the Croatian first futsal league.

The debut season in the Prva HMNL Olmissum ends on the second position in the regular season. In the playoffs, they beat Vrgorac in the quarterfinals, Futsal Dinamo in the semifinals and in the finals after a penalty, the double and current champion, Novo Vrijeme Apel. In the same season, they played in the Croatian futsal cup finals, but were defeated by Uspinjača Gimka 1–5.

In the 2020–21 season, Olmissum made its debut in the UEFA Futsal Champions League, and reached the round of 16 where it lost 1–2 to KPRF. In the domestic championship, the title was defended after the first place in the regular season, and the victory over Square (2–0 in the series), Futsal Dinamo (2–0 in the series) and Novo Vrijeme (3–0 in the series). In the same season, Olmissum won the first cup title with a victory over Vrgorac after 11 series of penalties.

Current team 

Source: HNS

European competitions record 

Source: UEFA Live Scores

Honours 

National competitions

 Croatian Prva HMNL: 2
 2019–20, 2020–21
 Croatian Druga HMNL: 1
 2018–19
 Split-Dalmatia County Futsal League: 1
 2016–17
 Croatian Futsal Cup: 1
 2020–21
 Futsal Cup of the South region: 2
 2018–19, 2019–20

References

External links
 Croatian Football Federation 

Futsal clubs in Croatia
Futsal clubs established in 2015
2015 establishments in Croatia